Edington Cottage Hospital is a hospital located in 54 St Baldred's Road, North Berwick, East Lothian. It is managed by NHS Lothian.

History
The hospital was founded by Elizabeth Edington (1831–1908), who bequeathed 10,000 pounds to found the hospital. Originally opened as Edington Home in October 1913, it was subsequently known as 'The Home of Tired Mothers'. It joined the National Health Service as Edington Cottage Hospital in 1948.

Services
Amongst other services, Edington Cottage Hospital has a minor injuries unit and GP beds for the frail elderly.

References

External links
Friends of Edington Hospital

Buildings and structures in East Lothian
NHS Scotland hospitals
NHS Lothian